Jakub Sklenář may refer to:

Jakub Sklenář (footballer) (born 1990), Czech association football player
Jakub Sklenář (ice hockey) (born 1988), Czech ice hockey player